Lawrence de Awkeburne (or Laurence de Hakeburne) was a medieval Bishop of Salisbury elect.

Awkeburne held the prebend of Ruscombe in the diocese of Salisbury before being elected bishop on 10 May 1288, but he died at Canterbury on 8 August 1288 before he could be consecrated.

Citations

References
 British History Online Bishops of Salisbury accessed on 30 October 2007

Bishops of Salisbury
1288 deaths
Year of birth unknown
13th-century English Roman Catholic bishops